Castle Street Methodist Church is a Methodist church located on Castle Street, Cambridge, England.

Castle Street is one of thirteen churches in the Cambridge Methodist Circuit.

It is a working church with a morning service each Sunday, and an evening service on all but the third Sunday in the month. There are 63 members and the minister is The Revd Alison Walker.

Building history

The first church on the site was converted from a cottage by Primitive Methodists. The first purpose-built chapel constructed in 1823, then rebuilt in 1841 and in 1863. A completely new building, designed by Augustus Frederic Scott was built in 1914 and gained Grade II listed status in 2003.

In 2010 it underwent a major refurbishment which included improved accessibility, sound system and a new organ console, though with the original 1929 Binns organ being retained.

Partnership
It is a member of the 'Church at Castle' ecumenical partnership with St Augustine's, St Giles' (Anglican), St Luke's (Anglican/URC) and St Peter's.

References

External links
 Mystery Worshipper Report at the Ship of Fools website

1823 establishments in England
19th-century churches in the United Kingdom
Grade II listed churches in Cambridgeshire
Methodist churches in Cambridge
Grade II listed buildings in Cambridge